The Best of Del tha Funkee Homosapien: The Elektra Years is a compilation album by American hip hop musician Del tha Funkee Homosapien. It was released by Rhino Records and Elektra Records in 2004. It includes tracks from I Wish My Brother George Was Here and No Need for Alarm, as well as B-side tracks and remixes. It peaked at number 35 on the CMJ Hip-Hop chart.

Critical reception
Andy Kellman of AllMusic gave the album 4 stars out of 5, saying: "This includes most of the best moments from George and 1994 follow-up, No Need for Alarm, making it valuable for those who haven't been able to track them down." He added: "However, those who have followed Del all along should also take note; this set also contains a small bounty of B-sides, most of which are of some import." Rollie Pemberton of Pitchfork gave the album a 6.3 out of 10, saying, "without the powerful straight-rap from the majority of No Need for Alarm, this Elektra-only greatest hits package fails on its own concept."

Track listing

References

External links
 

2004 compilation albums
Del the Funky Homosapien compilation albums
Rhino Records compilation albums
Elektra Records compilation albums